Eradane Sala (English: Second Time) is a 2017 Kannada-language Indian romantic comedy film written and directed by Guruprasad and produced by Yogesh Narayan. It stars Dhananjay and Sangeetha Bhat, in the leading roles, while Lakshmi plays an important supporting role. The soundtrack and score for the film was composed by Anoop Seelin.

The film was created in January 2014 and was in development hell for many months. Finally, it was revived in 2016 and the first trailer was released in January 2017.  The film was released on 3 March 2017.

Cast
 Dhananjay
Sangeetha Bhat
 Lakshmi
 Avinash
 Kirik Keerthi
 Padmaja Rao

Soundtrack

Anoop Seelin scored and sung all the songs for the film. Guruprasad wrote all the lyrics. The audio was officially released on 12 January 2017. It was reported that since Guruprasad took over three years to complete the film, a rift created between him and the producer Yogesh Narayan. This resulted in Guruprasad's absence during the audio launch.

References

External links
 
 Eradane Sala

2017 films
2010s Kannada-language films
2017 romantic comedy films
Indian romantic comedy films
Films scored by Anoop Seelin

Films directed by Guruprasad